Tim Dominik Sparwasser (* 8 January 1969 in Mainz) is a German physician, microbiologist and infection immunologist. In 2018, he became director of the Institute for Medical Microbiology and Hygiene (IMMH) in Mainz.

Education and career
Sparwasser studied human medicine at the Johannes Gutenberg-University Mainz and at the Ludwig-Maximilians-University Munich as a scholarship holder of the Studienstiftung des Deutschen Volkes; he received his doctor of medicine in 1996. He continued his research   first at the Institute for Medical Microbiology, Immunology and Hygiene  at the Technical University Munich (TUM) and afterwards at the Skirball Institute in New York as a Howard Hughes Medical Institute (HHMI) Postdoctoral Fellow .

In 2008, he habilitated at the MIH of the Technical University Munich became director of the Institute of Infection Immunology at Twincore, Centre for Experimental and Clinical Infection Research, a joint venture of the Hannover Medical School and the Helmholtz Centre for Infection Research .

In 2018, Sparwasser became director of the Institute for Medical Microbiology and Hygiene (IMMH), after he had previously declined a call from the Technical University Dresden in 2017.

From 2014 to 2022 he was a council member of the German Society of Immunology. In 2018 Sparwasser became a member of the steering committee of the Research Center for Immunotherapy at the University of Mainz. Since 2019 he is - after re-election in 2022 - the German representative to the Council of the International Union of Immunology Societies (IUIS). In 2022 Tim Sparwasser was appointed to the advisory board of the Center for Research in Inflammatory Diseases (CRID) in São Paulo. The CRID is supported by the Ribeirão Preto Faculty of Medicine at the University of São Paulo and the Foundation for Research Funding in the State of São Paulo (FAPESP).  In the same year Prof. Sparwasser declined a call from the Justus-Liebig University of Gießen to take a position as W3 Professor of Medical Microbiology. Since 2023 he is a member of the external Advisory Board from NextImmune2 at the Luxembourg Institute of Health (LIH).  In 2023 Prof. Sparwasser was awarded the "Premio Leloir", from the Argentinian Ministry of Science, Technology and Innovation, in Buenos Aires, for his activities to promote and strenghten German-Argentinian Cooperations.

Sparwasser is one of the most frequently cited immunologists in Europe. He has published many scientific papers, of which more than 200 are listed in the Science Citation Index. The publications are cited more than 19900 times and his h-index is 71.

Research work
The main research interests of his laboratory at the Institute of Medical Microbiology and Hygiene are host-pathogen interactions. Sparwasser was one of the first to recognize that microbial DNA sequences containing specific CpG motifs activate cells of the innate immune system and can therefore be used as adjuvants in experimental vaccination approaches. Using novel genetic models, Sparwasser for the first time directly demonstrated the role of so-called regulatory T cells in the prevention of autoimmunity as well as their importance in the adaptive immune response against tumor cells and various pathogens. Since 2010 Sparwasser has been working on the immune modulatory effects of bacterial metabolites and in particular on the metabolism of immune cells to improve immune responses and vaccinations.

Honors and awards
Sparwasser was a scholarship holder of the German National Academic Foundation. The German Society for Hygiene and Microbiology (DGHM) awarded him the DGHM prize in 1999. From 1999 to 2002 Sparwasser received the HHMI Postdoctoral Fellowship Award for Physicians. The Argentinian Ministry for Science, Technology and Innovation awarded Prof. Sparwasser the "Premio Leloir" in 2023.

References

External links 
 Literatur by and about Tim Sparwasser in the catalogue of the German National Library
 Literatur by and about Tim Sparwasser in the WorldCat bibliographic database
 Website of the chair Sparwassers 
 Website of the research laboratory Sparwasser
 Curriculum vitae of Tim Sparwasser (status 2019)
 Publications of Tim Sparwasser

Year of birth missing (living people)
Living people